Dilys Rhys Watling (née Jones, 5 May 1942 – 10 August 2021) was an English actress, best known for appearing on British television (Coronation Street, The Benny Hill Show and The Two Ronnies).

Early life and education
Watling was born Dilys Rhys Jones, the daughter of actor Ion Rhys Jones and Patricia Hicks. Ion Rhys Jones was killed in action in World War II, and her mother later married actor Jack Watling.

She attended St Mary's Convent School, Woodford, Essex, followed by acting school.

Career
She acted in repertory theatre and at the Bristol Old Vic. Watling was nominated for the Tony Award for Best Leading Actress in a Musical for her Broadway debut in the short-lived Georgy in 1970. It proved to be her sole Broadway credit. Other stage credits include the musical Pickwick (1964), an adaptation of Dickens's The Pickwick Papers; the role of the Beggar Woman in the 1980 London cast of Sweeney Todd in the West End; and the West End multi-media Dave Clark rock musical Time (1986). She also made occasional film appearances, including rôles in the comedy Two Left Feet (1963); crime film, Calculated Risk, (also 1963); and the horror film, Theatre of Death, (1967).

Personal life
Watling had four half-siblings through her mother's marriage to actor Jack Watling. These include actor Deborah and politician/actor Giles Watling.

Watling was married twice: her first marriage was to Australian Bruce Anderson in 1966; they later divorced. After a relationship with actor Christopher Matthews, in 1986 she married actor Owen Teale, with whom she had a son, Ion, before divorcing in the mid-1990s.

On 10 August 2021, she died aged 79 after a long illness.

TV credits

Filmography

References

External links

1942 births
2021 deaths
English musical theatre actresses
English television actresses
People from Gerrards Cross
Actresses from Buckinghamshire
20th-century English actresses
English people of Welsh descent
English film actresses
Alumni of Bristol Old Vic Theatre School